Dash 7 may refer to:

DASH7, a wireless sensor and actuator network protocol
De Havilland Canada Dash 7, aircraft manufactured by De Havilland Canada
GE Dash 7 Series, railway locomotive manufactured by GE Transportation Systems